Taylor Hazell Architects Limited is an architectural firm located in Toronto, Ontario.

History
The firm was established in 1991 by architects Jill Taylor and Charles Hazell. The principals sought to create a firm that focused on the values of restoration and conservation in Toronto, and throughout Ontario as a whole, at a time when the recession encouraged adaptive reuse as a strategy for avoiding expensive demolition and reconstruction.

Selected projects
1992: Dundurn Castle and Conference Centre, Hamilton, Ontario
1992: Bruce County Museum, Southampton, Ontario
1992–2010: Humber College Institute of Technology & Advanced Learning, Toronto, Ontario
1992-1993: Whitehern Historic House and Garden, Hamilton, Ontario
1994: Paisley Fire Hall and Hose Tower Restoration, Paisley, Ontario
1994–2013: R.C. Harris Water Treatment Plant, Toronto
1995–2005: Osgoode Hall Courthouse and Library, Toronto, Ontario
1996: McConaghy Seniors' Centre, Richmond Hill, Ontario
1997–2011: Casa Loma, Toronto, Ontario
1997–2009: St. Paul's Basilica, Toronto, Ontario
2000–2010: Union Station, Toronto, Ontario
2002-current: Canstage Theatre, Toronto, Ontario
2005: Humber College Institute of Technology & Advanced Learning Library, Toronto, Ontario
2005–2006: Brantford Superior Courthouse, Brantford, Ontario
2005–2007: Humber Arboretum Centre for Urban Ecology, Toronto, Ontario
2005–2009: Toronto Courthouse, Toronto, Ontario
2005–2011: Legislative Assembly of Ontario, Toronto, Ontario
2007–2009: Lebovic Centre for Arts & Entertainment, Whitchurch-Stouffville, Ontario
2009: Brockville Psychiatric Hospital, Brockville, Ontario
2008–2010: Elgin & Winter Garden Theatre], Toronto, Ontario
2009–2012: Alderlea Heritage Estate, Brampton, Ontario
2010–2011: Point Abino Light Tower, Fort Erie, Ontario

Awards

Canadian Association of Heritage Professionals Awards
2013: Award of Excellence in Conservation for R.C. Harris Water Treatment Plant
2012: Award for Preservation of Heritage Building or Complex for Point Abino Lighthouse
2012: Award of Merit for Craftsmanship for Elgin and Winter Garden Theatre
2011: Award of Merit for Adaptive Reuse Project for Lebovic Centre for Arts and Entertainment
2010: Heritage Communication Award for "Building on History" Architectural Exhibit at the Harbourfront Centre, Toronto
2009: Award of Merit for Adaptive Reuse Project for Humber College Institute of Technology and Advanced Learning, Toronto
2009: Award of Merit for Preservation of Heritage Building or Complex for Casa Loma Roman Stone & Scottish Tower Conservation and Restoration

Ontario Architect's Association Awards
2010: Award of Excellence for the Humber Arboretum Centre for Urban Ecology
2010: Michael and Wanda Plachta Award for the Humber Arboretum Centre for Urban Ecology (Honoring architectural excellence for projects in Ontario that cost less than $8 million)

Heritage Toronto Awards
2012: Award of Excellence for Elgin and Winter Garden Theatre Exterior Restoration
2012: Award of Excellence for Berkeley Street Theatre (CanStage)
2009: Award of Excellence for Casa Loma Roman Stone & Scottish Tower Conservation and Restoration
2002: Award of Merit for Casa Loma Stable Tower
2002: Certificate of Commendation for Humber College Carriage House Restoration
1997: Award of Merit for Osgoode Hall

Design Exchange Awards
2009: Bronze Medal for "Architecture - Commercial" for the Humber Centre for Urban Ecology
2004: Silver Medal for Urban Design for Humber College Institute of Technology and Advanced Learning

Toronto Historical Board Awards
2003: Award of Merit for Humber College Institute of Technology and Advanced Learning
2002: Award of Merit for Casa Loma
1997: Award of Merit for Osgoode Hall

Toronto Construction Association Awards
1999: "Best of the Best" Award for Osgoode Hall Conservation Project
1998: "Best of the Best" Award for Osgoode Hall Conservation Project

Building Owner's and Management Association Certificates
2010: Certificate of Achievement
2009: Certificate of Building Excellence

Other awards
2014: Ontario Masonry Design Award - Provincial Award for Restoration Design for R.C. Harris Water Treatment Plant
2014: Brampton Urban Design Awards - Award of Excellence in Heritage Restoration for the Alderlea Heritage Estate
2006: Brantford Heritage Committee Heritage Recognition Award for the Brantford Courthouse

References

External links 
 www.taylorhazell.com
 The Centre for Urban Ecology

Architecture firms of Canada
Companies based in Toronto